Marine Fighter Attack Squadron 235 (VMFA-235) was a United States Marine Corps squadron that most recently flew F/A-18 Hornets. Known as the "Death Angels", the squadron participated in action during World War II, the Vietnam War, Operation Desert Storm and was decommissioned on June 14, 1996.

History

World War II

Marine Fighter Attack Squadron was commissioned on January 1, 1943 at Marine Corps Air Station El Toro, California as Fixed Wing Marine Scout Bombing Squadron 235 (VMSB-235).  During World War II they flew the SBD Dauntless and participated in Operation Cartwheel, the  Battle of Bougainville and operations in and around Rabaul.  The squadron was decommissioned on November 10, 1944.

During 8,000 hours of flying operations, the squadron had only one casualty; an aircraft ground-looped while landing, breaking the pilot's arm. The squadron's most notable member in this period was future senator Joseph McCarthy, who served as its intelligence officer until July 1944. He participated in eleven missions as a rear gunner, leading to his later nickname of "Tail-Gunner Joe".

1950s

The squadron was recalled to active duty in September 1950 as part of Marine Aircraft Group 15 at MCAS El Toro flying the F4U Corsair.  In September 1952 they transitioned to the F9F Panther and in March 1954 they again transitioned to the FJ Fury.  In 1957 the squadron relocated to Marine Corps Air Station Beaufort.

The Vietnam War
Redesignated Fixed Wing Marine Fighter (All Weather) Squadron VMF(AW)-235 deployed to Vietnam on February 1, 1966 flying the F-8E Crusader.  Between February 2 and November 15, 1966 the “Death Angels” flew over 6,000 combat sorties in support of over 22 major operations.  They returned to Vietnam on February 15, 1967 this time for over a year until May 11, 1968.  They were the last active duty Crusader squadron.  Upon leaving Vietnam, the squadron moved to Marine Corps Air Station Kaneohe Bay. On September 6, 1968 they were redesignated Fixed Wing Marine Fighter Attack Squadron VMFA-235 and equipped with the F-4 Phantom.

The 1980s & 1990s

In November 1989, VMFA-235 transitioned to the F/A-18 Hornet.  After Iraq’s invasion of Kuwait in August 1990, the squadron was deployed to the Shaikh Isa Air Base, Bahrain, on August 22, 1990 in support of Operation Desert Shield. They were the first Fighter squadron in theater, and were recognized with the "Phoenix Award", a highly prestigious Department of Defense award, for outstanding performance. During Operation Desert Storm they flew over 2800 sorties in support of coalition forces.  In March, 1990, after seven months of operations, VMFA-235 redeployed to Marine Corps Base Hawaii.

The squadron moved to MCAS El Toro in 1994 and was attached to Marine Aircraft Group 11.  They moved again to Marine Corps Air Station Miramar in 1996 and were decommissioned later that year on June 14.

See also

 Orson Swindle
 United States Marine Corps Aviation
 List of active United States Marine Corps aircraft squadrons
 List of decommissioned United States Marine Corps aircraft squadrons

Notes

References
Bibliography

 

Web

 VMFA-235 Homepage
 Squadron history from ‘’www.tailhook.org’’
 Photos of VMF(AW)-235 in action in Vietnam

Fighter attack squadrons of the United States Marine Corps
Inactive units of the United States Marine Corps